Laval-des-Rapides is a provincial electoral district in the Laval region of Quebec that elects members to the National Assembly of Quebec. It is located between Autoroute 15 and Autoroute 19 and between Rivière des Prairies and Autoroute 440.

It was created for the 1981 election from parts of Fabre and Mille-Îles electoral districts.

In the change from the 2001 to the 2011 electoral map, it gained a small amount of territory from Mille-Îles.

From when the riding was created in 1981 until 2014, the riding had always voted for the winning party in every general election.

Members of the National Assembly

Election results

* Result compared to Action démocratique

|-

|Renaissance 
|Michel Le Brun
|align="right"|26
|align="right"|0.19
|align="right"|–

References

External links
Information
 Elections Quebec

Election results
 Election results (National Assembly)
 Election results (QuébecPolitique)

Maps
 2011 map (PDF)
 2001 map (Flash)
2001–2011 changes (Flash)
1992–2001 changes (Flash)
 Electoral map of Laval region
 Quebec electoral map, 2011

Politics of Laval, Quebec
Laval-des-Rapides